Nolan Hickman Jr. (born May 7, 2003) is an American college basketball player for the Gonzaga Bulldogs of the West Coast Conference (WCC).

High school career
Hickman played basketball for Eastside Catholic School in Sammamish, Washington. As a sophomore, he helped his team reach the Class 3A state semifinals. In his junior season, he averaged about 17 points and three assists per game. Hickman competed for Seattle Rotary on the Amateur Athletic Union circuit. For his final season, he transferred to Wasatch Academy in Mount Pleasant, Utah. As a senior, he averaged 16 points, 5.4 assists and 3.9 rebounds per game. He was named to the McDonald's All-American Game and Jordan Brand Classic rosters and won the Utah Gatorade Player of the Year award.

Recruiting
Hickman was considered a five-star recruit by ESPN and Rivals, and a four-star recruit by 247Sports. He was one of the highest-ranked point guards in the 2021 class. Hickman originally committed to playing college basketball for Kentucky but later decommitted and was granted a full release from his National Letter of Intent. On May 15, 2021, he committed to Gonzaga over offers from Kansas and Auburn.

College career
Hickman was named to the West Coast Conference All-Freshman Team.

Career statistics

College

|-
| style="text-align:left;"| 2021–22
| style="text-align:left;"| Gonzaga
| 32 || 0 || 17.2 || .444 || .308 || .667 || 1.5 || 1.3 || .6 || .2 || 5.1

References

External links
Gonzaga Bulldogs bio

2003 births
Living people
American men's basketball players
Basketball players from Seattle
Gonzaga Bulldogs men's basketball players
McDonald's High School All-Americans
Point guards